Deborah Priya Henry (born 21 July 1985), also known as Priya Emmanuel, is a Malaysian TV Host of Indian and Irish descent and a former model and beauty pageant titleholder who was crowned Miss Universe Malaysia 2011 but did not make it to the semifinalists round. She was also crowned Miss Malaysia World 2007, and placed in the Top 15 at Miss World 2007.

Henry left her modelling career to champion the lives of refugee children in Malaysia.

Early life 
Deborah Henry was born in Dublin, Ireland and grew up in Kuala Lumpur, Malaysia. Her father is a Malaysian Indian and she is of Irish descent through her mother.

Henry spent her secondary school years at Sayfol International School. She particularly excelled in basketball and volleyball at school, and won a gold medal in the Kuala Lumpur International Schools athletics meet.  She received a "Sportswoman of the Year" trophy from her school for her achievements.

Henry began modelling at the age of 15 and modelled in London three years later for seven months. She appeared in Malaysian rock band Estranged's music video "Itu Kamu".

Henry holds a B. Arts. degree in Political Science and Economics from the University of Queensland, in Brisbane, Australia. Her focuses are on human rights advocacy and sustainable development with a long-term goal to eradicate poverty.

Career

Modelling 
Henry started modelling at 15, as a catwalk and print model in Kuala Lumpur. She moved to London in 2003. She took a hiatus from modelling in 2004 to further her studies in Brisbane. She returned to Malaysia in 2007 and participated in Miss Malaysia World 2007. She has also appeared on the covers of Elle India, Harper's Bazaar Malaysia, Marie Claire Malaysia and many more. She has also been featured in Vogue India.

Henry is the Face of Malaysian International Fashion Alliance (MIFA) 2011.

Beauty pageants

Miss World 2007
Henry won Miss Malaysia World 2007 and represented her country in Miss World 2007. She is notable for having been selected in the Top 15, the highest placement a Malaysian woman has achieved since Lina Teoh in 1998.

Miss Universe 2011
Henry, who stands , competed in her country's national beauty pageant Miss Universe Malaysia, held on 27 January 2011 in Kuala Lumpur, where she became the eventual winner of the title, gaining the right to represent her nation in Miss Universe 2011, but did not place in the semifinals.

TV Hosting 
Henry was also one of the three hosts for Bella, a magazine style talk show with Daphne Iking and Elaine Daly.

Acting
Henry was one of the cast for The Malay Chronicles: Bloodlines, a Malaysian film released on 10 March 2011.

Product endorsements
In March 2017, Henry released a ready-to-wear clothing line named Deborah Henry x FashionValet: Laidback Luxe. In collaboration with Fashion Valet, the line features clothing intended for trendy travelers.

Humanitarian work 
Henry co-founded Fugee School, a non-profit charity organisation that provides basic education to Somalian refugee children. To date, the school has educated more than 250 students, and currently nurturing 130 students from age four to 22. Henry is also a World Vision's Childs' rights Advocate. World Vision is a Christian relief, development and advocacy organisation. She also speaks for the Harper's Bazaar The Pink Project PSA 2010. Henry became the ambassador for Yes, I Can Campaign, an educational, awareness & advocacy campaign for the prevention of unplanned & unwanted pregnancy in Malaysia.

In 2013, Henry was included in Forbes's list of top Asian philanthropists for her contribution in "helping the many refugees from war-torn Somalia who had found their way to Malaysia".

In 2016, in conjunction with the holy month of Ramadan, Henry launched a personal fundraiser under World Vision Malaysia to raise money for displaced Syrian nationals seeking refuge in Lebanon.

Henry became one of Malaysian AIDS Foundation Red Ribbon Celebrity Supporter in 2018 joining the likes of Dato' Sri Siti Nurhaliza, Datuk Aaron Aziz, Bob Yusof, Dayang Nurfaizah, Joey G and Fahrin Ahmad to spread safe sex awareness in Malaysia. She will also be emceeing the 2018 Tun Dr Siti Hasmah Award Gala Dinner alongside Fahrin Ahmad.

Personal life
Henry married Malaysian entrepreneur, Dr Rajiv Bhanot, on 27 February 2017 in a ceremony held at Udaipur, India. They met when Henry was sixteen years old.

References

1985 births
Living people
Malaysian female models
Malaysian people of Indian descent
Malaysian people of Irish descent
Irish emigrants to Malaysia
Miss Universe 2011 contestants
Miss World 2007 delegates
Malaysian socialites
Sayfol International School alumni
University of Queensland alumni
Malaysian beauty pageant winners
Malaysian Christians
Miss Universe Malaysia
Citizens of Malaysia through descent
Irish people of Malaysian descent
Irish people of Indian descent
Irish Christians